Ellisville is an unincorporated community in the town of Montpelier, Kewaunee County, Wisconsin, United States. The George Halada Farmstead, which is listed on the National Register of Historic Places, is in Ellisville.

References

Unincorporated communities in Kewaunee County, Wisconsin
Unincorporated communities in Wisconsin